This article contains information about the literary events and publications of 1987.

Events
January 2 – Golliwogs in Enid Blyton children's books are replaced by the British publisher with gnomes after complaints of a racial offence implication.
April – K. W. Jeter coins the term "Steampunk" in a letter published in Locus: the magazine of the science fiction & fantasy field.
June – Virago Press of London publishes Down the Road, Worlds Away, a collection of short stories ostensibly by Rahila Khan, a young Muslim woman living in England. Three weeks later, Toby Forward, an Anglican clergyman, admits to writing them and the publisher withdraws the book. "He, unlike the editors at Virago, had grown up in precisely the kind of area and social conditions that the book described.... Although the book never claimed to be other than a work of fiction, the publishers destroyed the stock still in the warehouse and recalled all unsold copies from the bookshops, thus turning it into an expensive bibliographical rarity."
July 31 – The United Kingdom Attorney General takes legal proceedings on security grounds against the London paper The Daily Telegraph to prevent it publishing details of the book Spycatcher. On September 23, an Australian court lifts its ban on the book's publication.
August – A new building for the National Library of New Zealand in Wellington opens.
unknown dates
Tom Wolfe is paid US$5 million for the film rights to his novel The Bonfire of the Vanities (published in book format in October), a record fee to an author at this time.
Ian Rankin's Knots and Crosses, first of the Inspector Rebus detective novels set around Edinburgh, is published in London.

New books

Fiction
Chinua Achebe – Anthills of the Savannah
Peter Ackroyd – Chatterton (shortlisted for Booker Prize 1987)
Douglas Adams – Dirk Gently's Holistic Detective Agency
Martin Amis – Einstein's Monsters
Gilles Archambault – L'Obsédante obèse et autres agressions
Paul Auster
The New York Trilogy
In the Country of Last Things
Iain Banks
Consider Phlebas (as Iain M. Banks)
Espedair Street
Clive Barker – Weaveworld
Greg Bear – The Forge of God
Thomas Berger – Being Invisible
William Boyd – The New Confessions
T.C. Boyle – World's End (1988 PEN/Faulkner Award for Fiction)
Marion Zimmer Bradley – The Firebrand
Truddi Chase – When Rabbit Howls
Tom Clancy – Patriot Games
Hugh Cook
The Wordsmiths and the Warguild
The Women and the Warlords
Robin Cook – Outbreak
Bernard Cornwell
Redcoat
Sharpe's Rifles
Robert Crais – The Monkey's Raincoat
L. Sprague de Camp and Catherine Crook de Camp – The Incorporated Knight
Jenny Diski – Rainforest
Jim Dodge – Not Fade Away
Roddy Doyle – The Commitments
Bret Easton Ellis – The Rules of Attraction
James Ellroy – Black Dahlia
Carlos Fuentes – Christopher Unborn
Neil Gaiman and Dave McKean – Violent Cases (graphic novel)
John Gardner – No Deals, Mr. Bond
Kaye Gibbons – Ellen Foster
Ken Grimwood – Replay
Larry Heinemann – Paco's Story (1987 National Book Award for Fiction)
Tom Holt – Expecting Someone Taller
Josephine Humphreys – Rich in Love
Dương Thu Hương – Bên kia bờ ảo vọng (Beyond Illusions)
John Jakes – Heaven and Hell
Tahar Ben Jelloun – La Nuit sacrée (The Sacred Night)
Garrison Keillor – Leaving Home: A Collection of Lake Wobegon Stories
Jesse Lee Kercheval – The Dogeater
Ungulani Ba Ka Khosa – Ualalapi
Stephen King
Misery
The Dark Tower II: The Drawing of the Three
The Tommyknockers
The Eyes of the Dragon
Penelope Lively – Moon Tiger
Ian McEwan – The Child in Time
Betty Mahmoody – Not Without My Daughter
James A. Michener – Legacy
Alan Moore and Dave Gibbons – Watchmen (graphic novel)
Finola Moorhead – Remember the Tarantella
Toni Morrison – Beloved (1988 Pulitzer Prize for Fiction)
V. S. Naipaul – The Enigma of Arrival
Michael Ondaatje – In the Skin of A Lion
Robert B. Parker – Pale Kings and Princes
Gary Paulsen – Hatchet
Ellis Peters – The Hermit of Eyton Forest
Rosamunde Pilcher – The Shell Seekers
Peter Pohl – Vi kallar honom Anna
Terry Pratchett
Equal Rites
Mort
Paul Quarrington – King Leary
Edward Rutherfurd – Sarum
José Saramago – Baltasar and Blimunda
Leonardo Sciascia – Porte aperte
Michael Shea – Polyphemus
Sidney Sheldon – Windmills of the Gods
Lucius Shepard – The Jaguar Hunter
Carol Shields – Swann: A Mystery
Michael Slade – Ghoul
Danielle Steel
Fine Things
Kaleidoscope
Scott Turow – Presumed Innocent
Andrew Vachss – Strega
Gore Vidal – Empire
Barbara Vine – A Fatal Inversion
William T. Vollmann – You Bright and Risen Angels
Kurt Vonnegut – Bluebeard
Gene Wolfe – The Urth of the New Sun
Tom Wolfe – The Bonfire of the Vanities
Gamel Woolsey (posthumously) – One Way of Love (written 1930)
Roger Zelazny – Sign of Chaos

Children and young people
Lloyd Alexander – The Illyrian Adventure
Chris Van Allsburg – The Z Was Zapped (alphabet book)
Tedd Arnold – No Jumping on the Bed!
Janice Elliott – The King Awakes (first in The Sword and the Dream series)
Anne Fine – Madame Doubtfire
Willi Glasauer – Grüße aus der Fremde (Greetings from the Surreal)
Witi Ihimaera – The Whale Rider
Julius Lester – The Tales of Uncle Remus: the Adventures of Brer Rabbit
Bill Peet – Jethro and Joel Were a Troll
Ruth Thomas – The Runaways
Theresa Tomlinson – The Flither Pickers (first in the Against the Tide trilogy)
Audrey Wood – Heckedy Peg
Jane Yolen – Owl Moon

Drama
Nezihe Araz – Afife Jale
Caryl Churchill – Serious Money
Robert Harling – Steel Magnolias
Liz Lochhead – Mary Queen of Scots Got Her Head Chopped Off
Adam Long, Daniel Singer and Jess Winfield – The Complete Works of William Shakespeare (abridged)
Stephen Mallatratt (adapted from Susan Hill) – The Woman in Black
Warren Manzi – Perfect Crime
Peter Shaffer – Lettice and Lovage

Non-fiction
Claude-François Baudez & Sydney Picasso – Lost Cities of the Maya
Allan Bloom – The Closing of the American Mind
David Bohm – Science, Order, and Creativity
Robert V. Bruce – The Launching of Modern American Science, 1846–1876
Bruce Chatwin – The Songlines
Nien Cheng – Life and Death in Shanghai
Bill Cosby – Time Flies
Andrea Dworkin – Intercourse
Sita Ram Goel – The Calcutta Quran Petition
C. Z. Guest – First Garden (approximate year – book undated)
Robert Hughes – The Fatal Shore
Georges Jean – Writing: The Story of Alphabets and Scripts
Paul Kennedy – The Rise and Fall of the Great Powers: Economic Change and Military Conflict From 1500 to 2000
Nicholas Kenyon (editor) – Authenticity and Early Music
Steven Long – Death Without Dignity: The Story of the First Nursing Home Corporation Indicted for Murder
Salman Rushdie – The Jaguar Smile: A Nicaraguan Journey
Randy Shilts – And the Band Played On: Politics, People, and the AIDS Epidemic
Donald Trump (attrib.) and Tony Schwartz – Trump: The Art of the Deal
Peter Wright – Spycatcher

Births
February 11 – Julio Torres, Salvadoran writer, comedian, and actor
February 27 – Alexandra Bracken, American young-adult novelist
April 12 – Ilana Glazer, American comedian, director, producer, writer, and actress
December 15 – Mayra Dias Gomes, Brazilian journalist and columnist
unknown dates
Mina Adampour, Norwegian journalist, politician and activist of Iranian origin
Katherine Rundell, English children's writer and academic brought up in Zimbabwe and Belgium

Deaths
January 15 – George Markstein, German-born English journalist and thriller writer (kidney failure, born 1926)
February 2 – Alistair MacLean, Scottish thriller writer (heart attack, born 1922)
February 4 – Wynford Vaughan-Thomas, Welsh journalist and broadcaster (born 1908)
February 10 – William Rose, American screenwriter (born 1918)
February 22 – Andy Warhol, American artist, director and writer (cardiac arrhythmia, born 1928)
March 4 – Maria Jolas (Maria McDonald), American-born French publisher and campaigner (born 1893)
April 4 – C. L. Moore, American science fiction author (born 1911)
April 11 
 Erskine Caldwell, American novelist (born 1903)
 Primo Levi, Italian chemist and writer (born 1919)
May 13 – Richard Ellmann, American-born biographer (born 1918)
May 18 – Heðin Brú, Faroese fiction writer and translator (born 1901)
May 30 – Norman Nicholson, English poet (born 1914)
June 6 – Fulton Mackay, Scottish actor and playwright (born 1922)
June 7 – Humberto Costantini, Argentinian writer (cancer, born 1924)
July 26 – Tawfiq al-Hakim, Egyptian novelist and dramatist (born 1898)
August 18 – Dambudzo Marechera, Zimbabwean writer (born 1952)
September 1 – Alan Reid ("Red Fox"), English-born Australian journalist (cancer, born 1914)
September 25 – Emlyn Williams, Welsh dramatist (born 1905)
September 30 – Alfred Bester, American science fiction writer (born 1913)
October 3 – Jean Anouilh, French dramatist (born 1910)
October 8 – Roger Lancelyn Green, English biographer and children's author (born 1918)
October 9 – Clare Boothe Luce, American playwright (born 1903)
October 31 – Joseph Campbell, American author and mythology expert (born 1904)
November 29 – Gwendolyn MacEwen, Canadian poet (alcohol-related, born 1941)
December 1 – James Baldwin, African American novelist (stomach cancer, born 1924) 
December 17 – Marguerite Yourcenar, French novelist and essayist (born 1903)

Awards
Nobel Prize for Literature: Joseph Brodsky

Australia
The Australian/Vogel Literary Award: Jim Sakkas, Ilias
C. J. Dennis Prize for Poetry: Lily Brett, The Auschwitz Poems
Kenneth Slessor Prize for Poetry: Philip Hodgins, Blood and Bone
Mary Gilmore Prize: Jan Owen, Boy with Telescope
Miles Franklin Award: Glenda Adams, Dancing on Coral

Canada
See 1987 Governor General's Awards for a complete list of winners and finalists for those awards.

France
Prix Goncourt: Tahar ben Jelloun, La Nuit sacrée
Prix Médicis French: Pierre Mertens, Les Éblouissements
Prix Médicis International: Antonio Tabucchi, Indian Nocturne

United Kingdom
Booker Prize: Penelope Lively, Moon Tiger
Carnegie Medal for children's literature: Susan Price, The Ghost Drum
Cholmondeley Award: Wendy Cope, Matthew Sweeney, George Szirtes
Eric Gregory Award: Peter McDonald, Maura Dooley, Stephen Knight, Steve Anthony, Jill Maughan, Paul Munden
James Tait Black Memorial Prize for fiction: George Mackay Brown, The Golden Bird: Two Orkney Stories
James Tait Black Memorial Prize for biography: Ruth Dudley Edwards, Victor Gollancz: A Biography
Whitbread Best Book Award: Christopher Nolan, Under the Eye of the Clock
Sunday Express Book of the Year: Brian Moore, The Colour of Blood

United States
Agnes Lynch Starrett Poetry Prize: David Rivard, Torque
Aiken Taylor Award for Modern American Poetry: Howard Nemerov
American Academy of Arts and Letters Gold Medal for Belles Lettres:  Jacques Barzun
Frost Medal: Robert Creeley / Sterling Brown
National Book Critics Circle Award: to The Making of the Atomic Bomb by Richard Rhodes
National Book Award for Fiction: to Paco's Story by Larry Heinemann
Nebula Award:  Pat Murphy, The Falling Woman
Newbery Medal for children's literature: Sid Fleischman The Whipping Boy
PEN/Faulkner Award for Fiction: to Soldiers in Hiding by Richard Wiley
Pulitzer Prize for Drama: August Wilson, Fences
Pulitzer Prize for Fiction: Peter Taylor, A Summons to Memphis
Pulitzer Prize for Poetry: Rita Dove, Thomas and Beulah
Whiting Awards:
Fiction: Joan Chase, Pam Durban, Deborah Eisenberg, Alice McDermott, David Foster Wallace
Poetry: Mark Cox, Michael Ryan
Nonfiction: Mindy Aloff, Gretel Ehrlich
Plays: Reinaldo Povod

Elsewhere
Europe Theatre Prize: Ariane Mnouchkine, Théâtre du Soleil
Premio Nadal: Juan José Saer, La ocasión

Notes

References

 
Years of the 20th century in literature